Results from Norwegian football in 1921.

Class A of local Association Leagues
Class A of local association leagues (kretsserier) is the predecessor of a national league competition.

Norwegian Cup

Qualifying round

|}

First round

|}

Second round

|}

Third round

|}

Quarter-finals

|}

Semi-finals

|}

Final

National team

Sources:

References

External links
 RSSSF Norway

 
Seasons in Norwegian football